Tom Holmes (born 2 March 1996) is an English rugby league footballer who plays as a  or  for Bradford Bulls in the Betfred Championship.

He played for the Castleford Tigers (Heritage № 959) in the Super League, enjoying loan spells to the Batley Bulldogs in the Kingstone Press Championship and Oxford in League 1. He spent the 2018 season at Featherstone in the Championship, before moving to the Huddersfield Giants in the Betfred Super League, returning to Post Office Road on loan from Huddersfield in 2019.

Background
Holmes was born in Castleford, West Yorkshire, England.

Career

Castleford Tigers
He joined the Castleford Tigers from Castleford Lock Lane ARLFC in 2014 and made his Super League début in 2015 against the Catalans Dragons. During three years with the Tigers he was loaned out to League 1 side Oxford RLFC and Championship side Batley.

Featherstone Rovers
On 9 September 2017 it was announced Holmes would leave Castleford for Featherstone Rovers at the end of the 2017 season.

Huddersfield Giants
On 17 December 2020, it was announced that Holmes had left the club to pursue options in the Championship.

Featherstone Rovers (rejoin)
On 22 December 2020, it was announced Holmes would return to Featherstone Rovers.

He played for Featherstone in their 2021 Million Pound Game defeat against Toulouse Olympique.

Sheffield Eagles (Loan) 
In 2022 Holmes joined Championship side Sheffield Eagles  on loan in the search of regular first-team minutes.

References

External links
Huddersfield Giants profile
Featherstone Rovers profile
Castleford Tigers profile
SL profile

1996 births
Living people
Batley Bulldogs players
Bradford Bulls players
Castleford Tigers players
English rugby league players
Featherstone Rovers players
Huddersfield Giants players
Oxford Rugby League players
Rugby league halfbacks
Rugby league five-eighths
Rugby league hookers
Rugby league players from Castleford
Sheffield Eagles players